Charles Alfred Crickmore (11 February 1942 – 11 October 2018) was an English professional footballer. He played for Hull City, Bournemouth, Rotherham United, Norwich City,  Notts County and Gillingham between 1959 and 1972. He won a Football League Fourth Division championship medal in 1970 with Notts County and played in the Gillingham team that gained a surprise draw away to Arsenal in the Football League Cup.

References

1942 births
2018 deaths
English footballers
Gillingham F.C. players
Hull City A.F.C. players
Notts County F.C. players
AFC Bournemouth players
Rotherham United F.C. players
Footballers from Kingston upon Hull
Association football wingers
Norwich City F.C. players